Ray Vaughn Pierce (August 6, 1840 – February 4, 1914) was a U.S. Representative from New York.

Early life
Born in Stark, New York, Pierce was the son of Duane and Mary (Morse) Pierce. He attended public and private schools, and taught school before deciding to become a doctor. In 1862, he graduated from Eclectic Medical College in Cincinnati, Ohio. He practiced medicine in Titusville, Pennsylvania, from 1862 to 1866, and moved to Buffalo, New York, in 1867.

Career
Pierce engaged in the manufacture and sale of patent medicines and established the Invalids' Hotel and Surgical Institute. His manufacturing business started with "Doctor Pierce's Favorite Prescription", which he followed with other medicines, including Smart Weed and Dr. Pierce's Pleasant Pellets. His venture proved a success, with nearly one million bottles of Dr. Pierce's Smart Weed and other preparations shipped annually.

He was a member of the New York State Senate (31st D.) in 1878 and 1879. Pierce was elected as a Republican to the 46th United States Congress, holding office from March 4, 1879, to September 18, 1880, when he resigned.

Publication
After leaving Congress, Pierce resumed his business interests, and was publisher of a book, the People's Common-sense Medical Adviser.

Death

Pierce died on February 4, 1914, at his home on St. Vincent Island, Florida, where he had founded a game preserve. He was interred at Forest Lawn Cemetery, Buffalo, New York.

Family

Pierce was married to Mary Jane Smith. They were the parents of five children, three of whom reached adulthood: Valentine Mott, known as V. Mott; Hugh C.; and Ralph Waldo, known as Waldo.

References

External links
 
 
 
 New York Heritage Ray Vaughn Pierce Medical Artifacts Collection

1840 births
1914 deaths
Republican Party members of the United States House of Representatives from New York (state)
19th-century American politicians